Eduard Arbós Borras (born 7 May 1983) is a Spanish field hockey player. He is affiliated with Club Egara. He was a member of the Spanish National Team that claimed the silver medal at the 2008 Summer Olympics in Beijing, PR China.

External links
 
Athlete bio at 2008 Olympics official website

1983 births
Living people
Sportspeople from Terrassa
Spanish male field hockey players
Olympic field hockey players of Spain
Field hockey players at the 2008 Summer Olympics
Olympic silver medalists for Spain
Olympic medalists in field hockey
Medalists at the 2008 Summer Olympics